Marouan Kechrid (born 2 June 1981) is a Tunisian-French former basketball player and current coach. After starting his career with JS Kairouan, Kechrid played the majority of his career in Tunisia and won five CNA championships over an eighteen-year span. He also played for Ittihad Tanger and Maghreb de Fes in the Moroccan Division Excellence. 

Kechrid was a member of the Tunisia national basketball team that finished third at the 2009 FIBA Africa Championship to qualify for the country's first FIBA World Championship.  Kechrid averaged 9.8 PPG and 1.9 RPG for the Tunisians during the tournament.  He also competed for the Tunisians in the 2005 and 2007 FIBA Africa Championship.  He was a member of the Tunisian team that took part in the 2012 Summer Olympics.

Kechrid started his coaching career in 2021 as an assistant with US Monastir, and was promoted to head coach after a year. In October 2022, Kechrid and Monastir agreed to terminate their contract.

References

1981 births
Living people
Basketball players at the 2012 Summer Olympics
French men's basketball players
Olympic basketball players of Tunisia
Sportspeople from Dreux
Point guards
Shooting guards
Tunisian expatriate basketball people in Morocco
Tunisian men's basketball players
2010 FIBA World Championship players
Mediterranean Games bronze medalists for Tunisia
Mediterranean Games medalists in basketball
Competitors at the 2013 Mediterranean Games

US Monastir basketball coaches
Club Africain basketball players
US Monastir basketball players
ES Radès basketball players